Setiadi is a surname. Notable people with the surname include:

Arnold Setiadi (born 1988), American badminton player
Bagus Setiadi (born 1966), Indonesian badminton player
Bernadette N. Setiadi (born 1948), Indonesian social psychologist
Jadi Setiadi (born 1985), Indonesian weightlifter